Media in Indianapolis includes various print media, television, and radio in the Indianapolis, Indiana market. As of 2009, Indianapolis is ranked as the 25th largest media market, with over 1.1 million homes.

Radio and television broadcasts are governed by the FCC.

Print media
The Indianapolis Star has the most subscriptions for a daily newspaper in the city. It is owned by Gannett, which also publishes a weekly newspaper called The Topics that focuses on local and community-related news for northern Indianapolis and the surrounding suburbs.
 
Nuvo Newsweekly and Indianapolis Monthly are local publications concentrating on arts, entertainment, nightlife, and lifestyles.
 
The Indianapolis Recorder is a weekly publication that serves the African-American community. La Voz De Indiana is a bilingual newspaper focused on Latin-American issues. Tribuna News is a Bilingual (English-Spanish) newspaper for Hispanics in Indianapolis, focused on local news.
 
The Indianapolis Business Journal and Inside Indiana Business are business news publications for the greater Indianapolis region.

A community newspaper, The Broad Ripple Gazette, serves the Broad Ripple area of the city.

Television
Indianapolis is served by the following local broadcast television stations:

WTTV (4.1) — a CBS affiliate 
WTTV-DT2 (4.2) — Indy's4, independent
WTTV-DT3 (4.3) — a Comet affiliate 
WTTV-DT4 (4.4) - a TBD affiliate
WRTV (6.1) — an ABC affiliate
WRTV-DT2 (6.2) — a Grit affiliate
WRTV-DT3 (6.3) — a Laff affiliate
WRTV-DT4 (6.4) — a Court TV Mystery affiliate
WISH-TV (8.1) — a CW affiliate
WISH-DT2 (8.2) — a GetTV affiliate
WISH-DT3 (8.3) — a Twist affiliate
WISH-DT4 (8.4) — a Diya TV affiliate, South Asian programming
WTHR (13.1) — an NBC affiliate
WTHR-DT2 (13.2) — a Dabl affiliate
WTHR-DT3 (13.3) — a MeTV affiliate
WTHR-DT4 (13.4) — a True Crime Network affiliate
WTHR-DT5 (13.5) — a Quest affiliate
WTHR-DT6 (13.6) — a Circle affiliate
WREP-LD (15) — a Youtoo America affiliate
WCTY (16) — a local government-access television (GATV) channel (cable TV only)
WIIH-CD (17.1) — a GetTV affiliate
WDNI-CD (19.1) — a Telemundo affiliate, Spanish language programming
WDNI-DT2 (19.2) — a TeleXitos affiliate, Spanish language programming
WFYI (20.1) — a PBS member station
WFYI-DT2 (20.2) — PBS Kids
WFYI-DT3 (20.3) — Create, and a digital second feed of WFYI's programming offset by 2 days
WSWY-LD (21.1) - new affiliate: To Be Announced (silent)
WNDY-TV (23.1) — a My Network TV affiliate 
WNDY-DT2 (23.2) — a Bounce TV affiliate
WNDY-DT3 (23.3) — a NewsNet affiliate
WNDY-DT4 (23.4) - TBA
WUDZ-LD (28.1) — a Buzzr affiliate
WUDZ-DT2 (28.2) — an OnTV4U affiliate
WUDZ-DT3 (28.3) — a Sonlife Broadcasting Network affiliate
WUDZ-DT4 (28.4) — a Shop LC affiliate
WUDZ-DT5 (28.5) — a LXTV affiliate
WUDZ-DT6 (28.6) — a QVC2 affiliate
WUDZ-DT7 (28.7) — a Movies! affiliate
WTTK (29.1) — a CBS affiliate (simulcast of WTTV 4.1)
WTTK-DT2 (29.2) — Indy's4, independent (simulcast of WTTV 4.2)
WTTK-DT3 (29.3) — a Cozi TV affiliate
WSDI-LD (30.1) — an Ve Plus TV affiliate, Spanish language programming
WSDI-DT2 (30.2) — a Decades affiliate
WSDI-DT3 (30.3) — a Buzzr affiliate
WSDI-DT4 (30.4) — a CBN News Channel affiliate
WSDI-DT5 (30.5) — a SonLife affiliate
WSDI-DT6 (30.6) — a Stadium affiliate
WSDI-DT7 (30.7) — a Jewelry TV affiliate
WQDE-LD (33.1) — an OnTV4U affiliate
WECY-CD (UHF channel: TBA) — new affiliate: To Be Announced (silent)
WHMB-TV (40.1) — a Family Broadcasting owned and operated station
WHMB-DT2 (40.2) — a QVC affiliate
WHMB-DT3 (40.3) — a HSN affiliate
WHMB-DT4 (40.4) - TBA
WCLJ-TV (42.1) — a Bounce TV affiliate
WALV-CD (46.1) — a MeTV affiliate (simulcast of WTHR 13.3 )
WALV-DT2 (46.2) - a This TV affiliate
WALV-DT3 (46.3) - a Shop LC affiliate
WALV-DT4 (46.4) - a TheGrio affiliate
WALV-DT5 (46.5) - a QVC2 affiliate
WALV-DT6 (46.6) - an H&I affiliate
WBXI-CD (47.1) — a Start TV affiliate, CBS owned and operated station
WIPX-LD (51.1) - a Daystar owned and operated station
WXIN (59.1) — a FOX affiliate
WXIN-DT2 (59.2) — an Antenna TV affiliate
WXIN-DT3 (59.3) — a Court TV affiliate
WXIN-DT4 (59.4) — a Charge! affiliate
WIPX-TV (63.1) — an ION affiliate
WIPX-DT2 (63.2) — a Court TV affiliate
WIPX-DT4 (63.4) — a Court TV Mystery affiliate
WIPX-DT5 (63.5) — a Defy TV affiliate
WIPX-DT6 (63.6) — a TrueReal affiliate
WDTI (69.1) — a Daystar owned and operated station
WDTI-DT2 (69.2) - a Daystar Español affiliate, Christian Spanish language programming

Radio

FM stations

The Bob & Tom Show, syndicated across much of the United States, airs from Indianapolis.

AM stations

References

External links
Indianapolis, IN on American Radio Map (Radiomap.us)

 
Indianapolis